Sorin Ștefan Oncică (born 29 July 1973) is a Romanian former footballer who played as a midfielder.

Honours
Rapid București
Supercupa României: 1999
CFR Cluj
Divizia B: 2003–04
UEFA Intertoto Cup runner-up: 2005

References

External links

Sorin Oncică at Labtof.ro

1973 births
Living people
Romanian footballers
Association football midfielders
Liga I players
Liga II players
FC UTA Arad players
FC Rapid București players
ACF Gloria Bistrița players
CFR Cluj players
FC Universitatea Cluj players
Romanian football managers
People from Dolj County